Royal Sunset High School is a continuation high school in Hayward, California, United States, and is part of the San Lorenzo Unified School District.

References

External links
School website

Education in Hayward, California
Continuation high schools in California